Mountain Iron is a city in Saint Louis County, Minnesota, United States, in the heart of the Mesabi Range. The population was 2,878 at the 2020 census.

U.S. Highway 169 serves as a main route in Mountain Iron.

The city's motto is "Taconite Capital of the World". The local mine, Minntac, is owned by the United States Steel Corporation (U.S. Steel).

Mountain Iron is part of the Quad Cities, with Virginia, Eveleth, and Gilbert.

History
Mountain Iron was founded in 1892 as a mining village in the former Nichols Township. It was named after the nearby Mountain Iron Mine.

Mountain Iron was incorporated as a city in 1972.

Geography

Demographics

2010 census
As of the census of 2010, there were 2,869 people, 1,336 households, and 796 families living in the city. The racial makeup of the city was 96.8% White, 0.3% African American, 0.7% Native American, 0.2% Asian, and 2.0% from two or more races. Hispanic or Latino of any race were 0.6% of the population.

There were 1,336 households, of which 24.8% had children under the age of 18 living with them, 44.7% were married couples living together, 10.3% had a female householder with no husband present, 4.6% had a male householder with no wife present, and 40.4% were non-families. 35.9% of all households were made up of individuals, and 14.4% had someone living alone who was 65 years of age or older. The average household size was 2.14 and the average family size was 2.72.

The median age in the city was 45.4 years. 20.7% of residents were under the age of 18; 7.2% were between the ages of 18 and 24; 21.8% were from 25 to 44; 33% were from 45 to 64; and 17.4% were 65 years of age or older. The gender makeup of the city was 49.8% male and 50.2% female.

2000 census
As of the census of 2000, there were 2,999 people, 1,326 households, and 847 families living in the city. The racial makeup of the city was 98.30% White, 0.77% Native American, 0.23% Asian, 0.13% from other races, and 0.57% from two or more races. Hispanic or Latino of any race were 0.40% of the population. 27.3% were of Finnish, 11.2% German, 9.8% Italian, 8.8% Norwegian, 6.1% Swedish and 5.1% Slovene ancestry according to Census 2000.

There were 1,326 households, out of which 27.6% had children under the age of 18 living with them, 50.2% were married couples living together, 10.1% had a female householder with no husband present, and 36.1% were non-families. 31.2% of all households were made up of individuals, and 13.4% had someone living alone who was 65 years of age or older.  The average household size was 2.26 and the average family size was 2.83.

In the city, the population was spread out, with 22.9% under the age of 18, 9.4% from 18 to 24, 24.3% from 25 to 44, 27.9% from 45 to 64, and 15.5% who were 65 years of age or older.  The median age was 41 years. For every 100 females, there were 94.0 males.  For every 100 females age 18 and over, there were 90.4 males.

The median income for a household in the city was $35,163, and the median income for a family was $52,695. Males had a median income of $41,806 versus $22,837 for females. The per capita income for the city was $18,761.  About 7.8% of families and 10.7% of the population were below the poverty line, including 17.0% of those under age 18 and 5.4% of those age 65 or over.

References

Further reading
 Beck, J. Robert. Well, Here We Are! The Hansons and the Becks. Lincoln, Nebraska: iUniverse, 2005. . A history of a Swedish-Finnish immigrant family in Mountain Iron and the surrounding area.

External links

City of Mountain Iron—Taconite Capital of the World—The city's official site

Cities in Minnesota
Cities in St. Louis County, Minnesota
Mining communities in Minnesota
Populated places established in 1892
1892 establishments in Minnesota